Mastan Babu Malli (3 September 1974 – 24 March 2015) was an Indian mountaineer. He is best known for his 2006 world record of climbing the Seven Summits in the shortest span of time at that point - a total of 172 days with the first climb on 19 January 2006 and the seventh on 10 July 2006. This feat made him the first Indian and South Asian to climb all seven summits, the first Indian to climb Vinson Massif and the first Indian to climb Carstensz Pyramid. While his record for climbing the seven summits has since been improved upon, his record of attaining each summit on a different day of the week still stands today.

Mastan Babu died on 24 March 2015 in Andes mountains after getting caught in bad weather post a successful attempt of Tres Cruces Sur Summit. The continent-spanning journey that began with a schoolboy drawing inspiration from a Sainik School senior who had died while nearing the top of Mount Everest thus ended high on another demanding peak in the Andes. In between, he settled down for brief periods to earn degrees and a living.

Early life and education
Born on 3 September 1974 at Gandhi Janasangam village of Sangam Mandal in Nellore district, Andhra Pradesh to a Hindu family of Malli Mastanayya and Subbamma, Mastan Babu was their fifth child. He was amongst the first in his farming family to receive formal education. He is said to have been named after Mastan Swamy, a saint. He studied at Sainik School, Korukonda, Vijayanagaram district., Andhra pradesh state during 1985–1992. After completing his B. E. in Electrical Engineering from National Institute of Technology, Jamshedpur in 1996, Malli went on to earn an M.Tech. in electronics from Indian Institute of Technology Kharagpur in 1998, distinguishing himself in various sports and adventure activities at both institutes.

Following a three-year stint as a software engineer, with Satyam Computers, Malli was selected for the two-year Post Graduate Diploma in Management(PGDM) program at Indian Institute of Management Calcutta, graduating in 2004. An early inspiration for his turn towards mountaineering is said to have been the statue in his school of Lt. M.Uday Bhaskar Rao, a former student who was among those who died during the Indian Army's Everest expedition of 1985. In IIM Calcutta, he was given Dr. B.C. Roy award, for his outstanding contributions towards enriching campus life.

Malli's untiring efforts to increase the fitness levels of fellow-students and to institutionalize adventure activities led to the foundation of IIM-C's Adventure Club in 2003. It continues to hold many events, on and off campus.

Initiatives, achievements and awards
Malli was one of the recipients of the annual Distinguished Alumnus Award presented by IIM-C in November 2011. He also received the Army Commander's Commendation in 2007 and the 2006 Conjee Rustumjee Cohoujee Bey Award given by the Friends of South Asian American Communities in California (FOSACC) for outstanding youth contribution.

After completing climbing Mount Everest, he moved towards Mt.Kailash but he didn't step on it cause it is a sacred mountain. He continued to inspire countless students in his former schools and colleges by his record-breaking pursuits, writing to them, participating in alumni meets, and holding courses on hiking, high altitude trekking, Yoga, Vipassana meditation, etc. A proud Sainikorian, Malli paid tributes to his hero, Lt. Rao, and planted his school flag during his Everest trips. While many of his expeditions were unguided, they were always preceded by meticulous planning.

After the quick (172 days) summiting of the highest peak in each of the seven continents in 2006, Malli continued to set new benchmarks of physical and mental endurance and excellence.

In June and July 2007, he accomplished through trekking and climbing a high-altitude traverse of the four major Hindu dhams of Uttarakhand. Between 21 October and 3 November of the same year, he executed his plan to run 14 half marathons in 14 days in 14 different states, during which he received support from the Indian Army. Before the end of the year, he had run "8 full Marathons and 3 half marathons in 13 days, spanning 10 Indian states".

In 2008, he completed a "75 day High altitude trek from the Mount Everest region to Kanchenjunga, climbing all the high passes between them, covering a total of approximately 1,100km of the Himalayan terrain.". Through his 2,000-kilometre, 132-day trans-Himalayan expedition from Mount Everest to Mount Kailash, Malli wanted to bring to everyone's attention the damage being done to both hills and plains by global warming and also to help in mapping the change in glacier topography.South America, and especially its peaks, were a source of fascination for Malli, who travelled there often after first summiting Mt. Aconcagua in 2005.

Malli relished the opportunity of standing at top of peaks and of realizing the relative insignificance of humans when compared with awe-inspiring Nature.

Seven Summits
In 2006, he completed the Seven Summits, the highest peak in each of the seven continents, in a span 172 days, which was also a world record during that time. He climbed each summit on a different day of the week.

Awards and recognition
 Distinguished Alumnus Award by Indian Institute of Management, Calcutta in 2011

Final climb
After climbing Mt Aconcagua solo in 2005, Malli visited South America a number of times. He developed a special liking for the Andes and he climbed a number of Andean peaks. He became fluent in Spanish so that he could easily communicate with the locals. He wanted to climb the 10 highest peaks of the Andes.

Malli decided to climb Tres Cruces Sur summit (6,749 m) of  Nevado Tres Cruces  on 23 March 2015 before heading back for India on 28 March 2015. Weather deteriorated when he was descending after the successful summit of Trés Cruces.

Death

Malli went missing on 24 March 2015 and died outside his pitched tent on the slopes of Cerro Tres Cruces Sur in the Andes. Malli, who was climbing solo, was caught up in the exceptionally bad weather, which also led to the 2015 Northern Chile floods and mudflow, in the Andes. With all access routes to the mountain being cut, it took close to 10 days for the rescue teams to reach him. His body was found on 3 April 2015. He was supposed to have returned to India by month-end after adding the last of the ten highest peaks in the Andes to his list of conquests.

The PM of India Narendra Modi paid homage to Malli Mastan Babu. The Chief Minister of Andhra Pradesh N. Chandrababu Naidu condoled his death.

See also
Indian summiters of Mount Everest - Year wise
List of Mount Everest summiters by number of times to the summit
List of Mount Everest records of India
List of Mount Everest records

References

External links

Indian Institute of Management Calcutta alumni
IIT Kharagpur alumni
People from Nellore
Sportspeople from Andhra Pradesh
Indian mountain climbers
Indian summiters of Mount Everest
1974 births
2015 deaths
Summiters of the Seven Summits